Adalat is a 1958 Bollywood drama film directed by Kalidas, starring Pradeep Kumar, Nargis and Pran in lead roles. Composed by Madan Mohan, the songs are sung by Lata Mangeshkar, Asha Bhosle, Mohammed Rafi and Geeta Dutt. The film is especially known for its meaningful, touching ghazal-type songs and melodious music. Similarly, the actors Nargis and Pran performed well.

Plot
Nirmala and Barrister Rajendra Singh are in love and they have plans to get married soon. But Nirmala's aunt is jealous to see her happiness and hence wants to marry her off to an uneducated villager. The dispute turns big and Nirmala leaves her home. She takes a job in a dancing school, which turns out to be a front for a brothel. This lands her in prison, but she is not found guilty. When she returns home, she is turned away, and knowing about her shocks and kills her mom.

Again out on the streets, she attempts to find work. Pandit Kedarnath, a pimp, is now following her in order to get her for himself. But coincidentally, she meets Rajendra again. The lovers get married secretly. But then Rajendra leaves for Britain, leaving behind pregnant Nirmala. Rajendra's parents don't accept Nirmala and her child and throw her out. Nirmala gives birth to a baby boy. Her conditions worsen and she is not able to earn her living. She hence gives away her son to Dr. Renuka Roy, a kind woman, and goes into prostitution for earning money. The story turns when her son grows old to become a public prosecutor and his first case is of Nirmala, a prostitute, who is now charged with a murder.

Cast
 Pradeep Kumar as Barrister Rajendra Singh "Rajan"
 Nargis as Nirmala 
 Pran as  Pandit Kedarnath / Shareef Ahmed 
 Murad as Thakur Ranveer Singh 
 Achala Sachdev as Dr. Renuka Roy 
 Pratima Devi as Nirmala's Mother
 Yakub as Mirza
 Jawahar Kaul as Barrister Ratanlal Roy

Music
Lyrics of the songs are written by Rajendra Krishan and are composed by Madan Mohan.

 The song "Ja Ja Re Ja Sajna", has two versions (as "Slow" & "Fast", sung by Lata Mangeshkar and Asha Bhosle respectively) for the soundtrack, but in the film, it has only one version of the song (as a "Duet" song by Lata Mangeshkar and Asha Bhosle).

References

External links

1958 films
1950s Hindi-language films
Films scored by Madan Mohan
Indian drama films